= Museo di Storia Naturale, Piacenza =

Coordinates: 45°02′50″N 9°42′11″E

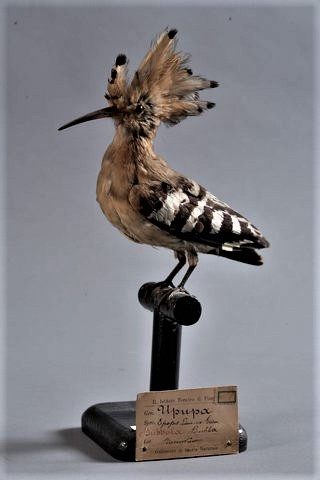

The Museo di Storia Naturale is the Natural History museum located Via Scalabrini 107 in Piacenza, Italy. The museum was established in a former abattoir or Macello. The area also houses the Polo Territoriale di Piacenza del Politecnico di Milano or the branch of the Milanese public scientific-technological university. The local branch is focused on technology useful for architectural design, including model building.

== History ==
The former abattoir had been built in the early 19th century and the structures altered in late 19th century under the designs of the engineers Diofebo Negrotti and Giovanni Perreau. The museum incorporates some of the machines used for the production of ice and refrigeration. Refurbishment of the site into a museum started in 1984 and was completed in 1991. The museum was previously hosted at the Palazzo Scotti da Fombio on via Taverna.
